The Mbole–Enya languages are a clade of Bantu languages coded Zone D.10 in Guthrie's classification. According to Nurse & Philippson (2003), apart possibly from Lengola the languages form a valid node. The other languages are:
  Enya–Zura, Mbole, Mituku
Nyali languages (D.33) may also belong. Lengola is part of the Lebonya proponal.

References